The New Mexico Ice Wolves are a Tier II junior ice hockey team in the North American Hockey League's South Division. The Wolves play their home games in the Outpost Ice Arenas in Albuquerque, New Mexico.

History
On February 28, 2019, the NAHL board of governors announced that they had approved the membership application for a team in New Mexico owned by Desert Ice Investment, LLC and that the team would start play in the 2019–20 season as a member of the South Division. Their inaugural season was cut short due to the COVID-19 pandemic, but the team had already been eliminated from playoff contention with 31 points in 52 games played. The team still won several postseason accolades such as Southern Division Organization of the Year and the NAHL's overall Organization of the Year. The following season, the team was forced to play home games in Texas due to the pandemic restrictions in New Mexico.

In 2022, the Ice Wolves added a Tier III junior team of the same name in the North American 3 Hockey League (NA3HL).

Season-by-season records

References

External links
New Mexico Ice Wolves website
NAHL website

North American Hockey League teams
North American Hockey League
Ice hockey teams in New Mexico
Sports in Albuquerque, New Mexico
2019 establishments in New Mexico
Ice hockey clubs established in 2019